Douglas James McLean Sr. (15 April 1880 – December 1947) was a pioneer Australian representative rugby union and rugby league footballer, a dual-code international. He also represented Queensland in rugby league.

Rugby union career
Born in Brisbane, Queensland McLean earned his debut as a centre with the Australian representative team playing against Great Britain, at Brisbane, on 23 July 1904. In total he played three tests, twice against the touring Great Britain side in 1904 and then in New Zealand the following year.

Rugby league career
McLean was a registered rugby union player in Queensland in 1908 at the time of the rugby league code's inaugural competition year in Australia. He was selected in the first ever Queensland Maroons state representative side to play the new "Northern Union" style of rugby, taking on Albert Baskerville's New Zealand All Golds on their inaugural tour. It would be his sole rugby league state appearance for Queensland.

When the New Zealand team came back on the return leg of their tour, they played three Test matches against the first Australian representative sides ever selected. The first Test was played in Sydney on 9 May 1908 with the Kiwis prevailing. McLean played in that Test on the wing and has been allocated Kangaroo representative No. 9.

McLean was one of five former Wallabies who debuted for the Kangaroos in that inaugural Test along with Dally Messenger, Micky Dore, Denis Lutge and John Rosewell. McLean and his Queensland former rugby union colleagues Dore and Bob Tubman were all disqualified by the Queensland Rugby Union within days.

Since his two rugby league Test appearances were made as a 1908 rebel before a Brisbane club competition began in 1909, Doug McLean Sr., like George Watson was a Kangaroo with no rugby league club career.

Rugby lineage
Doug Sr. was the patriarch of an extraordinary rugby union dynasty with three of his sons and three of his grandsons also playing for Australia.

His sons Doug McLean Jr., Bill McLean, and Jack McLean were Wallabies, with Doug Jr. also one of Australia's Dual-code rugby internationals. A fourth son Bob had two sons who represented for Australian in rugby union – Jeff McLean and Paul McLean, along with their cousin Peter McLean (Bill's son). See McLean Family (rugby footballers).

Sources
 The Spirit of Rugby (1995) – A collection of essays- Harper Collins, Australia
 Andrews, Malcolm (2006) The ABC of Rugby League, Austn Broadcasting Corpn, Sydney
 Whiticker, Alan & Hudson, Glen (2006) The Encyclopedia of Rugby League Players, Gavin Allen Publishing, Sydney
 Hodgson (1994) 'Australian Rugby – The Game and the Players', Jack Pollard Publishing Sydney

References

Australian rugby union players
Australian rugby league players
Australia national rugby league team players
Dual-code rugby internationals
Australia international rugby union players
Queensland rugby league team players
1880 births
1947 deaths
Doug Sr.
Rugby union players from Brisbane
Rugby union centres